Jorge de Moura Xavier (born 5 January 1991), commonly known as Jorginho, is a Brazilian footballer who plays as an attacking midfielder for Sport Recife.

Career statistics

Honours
Atlético Goianiense
Campeonato Brasileiro Série B: 2016
Campeonato Goiano: 2019, 2022

References

External links

1991 births
Living people
Sportspeople from Goiânia
Brazilian footballers
Association football midfielders
Campeonato Brasileiro Série A players
Campeonato Brasileiro Série B players
Campeonato Brasileiro Série C players
K League 1 players
Saudi Professional League players
Vila Nova Futebol Clube players
Atlético Clube Goianiense players
Club Athletico Paranaense players
Ceará Sporting Club players
Sport Club do Recife players
Seongnam FC players
Al-Qadsiah FC players
Brazilian expatriate footballers
Brazilian expatriate sportspeople in South Korea
Expatriate footballers in South Korea
Brazilian expatriate sportspeople in Saudi Arabia
Expatriate footballers in Saudi Arabia